Jana Rázlová (born 15 November 1974) is a Czech cross-country skier. She competed in three events at the 1994 Winter Olympics.

Cross-country skiing results
All results are sourced from the International Ski Federation (FIS).

Olympic Games

World Cup

Season standings

References

External links
 

1974 births
Living people
Czech female cross-country skiers
Olympic cross-country skiers of the Czech Republic
Cross-country skiers at the 1994 Winter Olympics
Sportspeople from Liberec